Tursunpashsha Nurmetova (born 17 January 1996) is an Uzbekistani Paralympic judoka. She represented Uzbekistan at the 2016 Summer Paralympics held in Rio de Janeiro, Brazil and she won the bronze medal in the women's 63 kg event.

References

External links 
 

1996 births
Living people
Uzbekistani female judoka
Paralympic judoka of Uzbekistan
Paralympic bronze medalists for Uzbekistan
Paralympic medalists in judo
Judoka at the 2016 Summer Paralympics
Medalists at the 2016 Summer Paralympics
Place of birth missing (living people)
21st-century Uzbekistani women